The Bertie Group or Bertie Limestone, also referred to as the Bertie Dolomite and the Bertie Formation, is an upper Silurian (Pridoli, or Cayugan and Ulsterian age in the local chronologies) geologic group and Lagerstätte in southern Ontario, Canada, and western New York State, United States. Details of the type locality and of stratigraphic nomenclature for this unit as used by the U.S. Geological Survey are available on-line at the National Geologic Map Database.

The group represents the uppermost unit of the Cayugan Series and the youngest Silurian unit in Ontario. The group overlies the Salina Group and is conformably overlain by the Devonian Bois Blanc Formation in Ontario and Onondaga Limestone in New York.

Two formations within the Bertie Group, the Fiddler's Green and Williamsville, are considered Konservat-Lagerstätten; geologic units that contain a unique and typically soft-bodied fauna. These formations have produced thousands of Silurian eurypterids (sea scorpions) as well as early scorpion Proscorpius osborni, xiphosurans, primitive fossil flora, and the fish Nerepisacanthus denisoni. The excellent preservation of the many eurypterids and other taxa was the possibly result of periodic hypersaline and anoxic conditions owing to the group's position within a shallow inland sea (the Appalachian basin).

Description 
The first author who recognized the group as a separate stratigraphic unit was Chapman in 1884. In more recent years, the unit has been elevated to group status.

Geographic extent 
The Bertie Group forms the bedrock in a narrow band extending from Fort Erie, west of Buffalo, New York, through Hagersville, New Hamburg, Harriston, and Walkerton to Southampton on Lake Huron. The group consists of medium- to massive-bedded aphanitic brown to grey, laminated, bituminous and burrowed dolomites, with minor thin-bedded shaly dolomites.

Sanford (1969) used the term Bertie Groupfrom Fort Erie to the vicinity of Hagersville and the term Bass Islands Formation north and west of Hagersville. The group is correlated with the Bass Islands Formation of Michigan. Bertie Group dolomite is quarried for crushed stone at Fort Erie, Port Colborne, Dunnville, Cayuga, and Hagersville.

Stratigraphy 
The Bertie Group is the uppermost unit in the Cayugan Series and forms part of the Tippecanoe II sequence. At its type locality, the group is subdivided into several formations. In central New York, the Group is subdivided into the Fiddlers Green Dolomite, Forge Hollow Shale, and Oxbow Dolomite members, from oldest to youngest. Here, the Bertie Group is overlain by the Honeoye and Chrysler formations. In New York, the Onondaga Limestone overlies the Bertie Group. The group is in Ontario conformably overlain by the Middle Devonian Bois Blanc Formation.

Laterally, the group is equivalent to the Bass Islands Formation and is mapped as a combined stratigraphic unit. Haynes and Parkins (1992) reported that the
Bertie Group is progressively cut by the Bass Islands Formation from Dunnville to Hagersville. In Pennsylvania, the Bertie Group is time-equivalent with the Keyser Formation.

Fossils 

The Bertie Group Fiddler's Green and Williamsville formations are considered Konservat-Lagerstätten; units characterized by rare and typically soft-bodied fauna. These formations have produced thousands of fossil eurypterids (sea scorpions) since collecting began in earnest in the mid-20th century.  Other fossils from the unit include early scorpion Proscorpius osborni, early flora, and a fossil fish; Nerepisacanthus denisoni. The excellent preservation of the many eurypterids possibly was the result of periodic hypersaline and anoxic conditions.

Age 
The Bertie Formation is late Silurian (Pridoli, or Cayugan and Ulsterian in the local chronologies).

Interpretations of depositional environments 

The Appalachian Foreland basin was formed during the Alleghanian orogeny in the Early to Middle Ordovician. The period of mountain building led to the closure of the Iapetus and Rheic Oceans. Due to tectonic loading, the foreland basin developed in the present-day area north of the Appalachian Mountains. Zones of stromatolites and thrombolites (non-laminated algal
mounds) occur in several formations in the Bertie Group, along with numerous desiccation cracks. During the Hercynian orogeny in the Devonian, many of the Silurian sediments were eroded to the south in the Appalachians, while north of the mountains the Silurian units were preserved.

The sediments of the Bertie Group were deposited on the paleosouthern side of the subsiding Algonquin Arch, flanking the northern rim of the Appalachian foreland basin of Laurentia.

The Bertie Group was deposited in a hypersaline marine environment. Alternating hypersaline and brackish estuarine conditions have been recorded in the group. The dolomitization of the group most probably was not primary.

See also 

 List of fossiliferous stratigraphic units in New York
 List of fossiliferous stratigraphic units in Ontario
 Tonoloway Formation, contemporaneous formation of Pennsylvania, Maryland, Virginia and West Virginia
 Tymochtee Dolomite, contemporaneous dolomite formation of Ohio
 Catavi Formation, contemporaneous fossiliferous formation of Bolivia
 Peel Sound Formation, contemporaneous fossiliferous formation of Nunavut, Canada 
 Stony Mountain Formation, Late Ordovician Lagerstätte of Manitoba, Canada
 Lau event, Late Silurian extinction event preceding the Bertie fauna

References

Bibliography

External links 

 The Eurypterida of New York/Volume 1
 The Eurypterida of New York/Volume 2

 
Geologic formations of New York (state)
Geologic formations of Ontario
Silurian System of North America
Silurian Ontario
Silurian United States
Dolomite formations
Limestone formations
Lagoonal deposits
Shallow marine deposits
Fossiliferous stratigraphic units of North America
Paleontology in New York (state)
Paleontology in Ontario
Formation
Formation
Formation
Formation